Douglas Point Conservation Park is a protected area in the Australian state of South Australia located in the gazetted locality of Cape Douglas in the state's south east about  south-west of Mount Gambier and about  north west of the township of Port MacDonnell.  The conservation park was proclaimed under the National Parks and Wildlife Act 1972 in 1997 ‘to protect the endangered plant species, Sand Ixodia’.  The conservation park is classified as an IUCN Category VI protected area.

References

External links
Douglas Point Conservation Park official webpage
  Douglas Point Conservation Park webpage on protected planet

Conservation parks of South Australia
Protected areas established in 1997
1997 establishments in Australia